West Lake STEM Junior High or WLJH is a public junior high in West Valley City, Utah. It is located at 3400 South and 3450 West in the Granger region of West Valley City. The school belongs to the very large Granite School District, which covers a large portion of the Salt Lake Valley in Utah.

Background
The school was built in 1964. Students who attend West Lake come from the area approximately bounded by 2100 South on the north, I-215 on the east, 3500 South on the south, and 4800 West on the west. The school is located in the heart of West Valley City. The school had 64 classrooms, including six relocatable classrooms and a Parent and Family Center. This will vary as construction begins on the new campus.  West Lake is a Title One school and receives additional funding from Highly Impacted Schools, Gear Up, and Schools for the 21st Century. These grants allow West Lake to reduce class size, offer after-school and summer programs, and additional opportunities for students, faculty, and community.

As of the 2020-2021 school year, the school has been relocated to a location known as the old campus for Westbrook Elementary due to severe earthquake damage on the main building. Due to the terrible damage done by the Magna earthquake, the building has been demolished and will be replaced by another building thought to be finished in 2025.

Enrollment
West Lake serves approximately 800 students in grades 7–8.  Students come from many parts of the world, creating a rich diversity among our student body. A majority of the school staff is ESL endorsed and/ or trained in Sheltered English Strategies. There have been as many as 31 different languages spoken by the students and families of West Lake Jr. High. Even the teachers at WLJH represent the multicultural makeup of West Lake, as many of them have cultural backgrounds outside the United States.

Computers and Technology
West Lake has a computer network system that is accessed by every classroom in the building. The Media center is a central lab that can be used by all students for research, with access to online information and many other library systems. The school has a series of labs throughout the building designed to enhance the curriculum and are also used for testing purposes. They have three laptop computer carts (with wireless Internet access) that teachers can check out and use in their classroom. West Lake has a small studio where student video broadcasts are created and shown during the morning announcements. They have grades, attendance and student information on the Internet for parents.  Parents can come to the Parent and Family Center and access their student's grade and attendance information.

Promotion
Students of West Lake continue to either Hunter High School or Granger High School.

References

External links
Granite School District
West Lake Junior High

Public middle schools in Utah
School buildings completed in 1964
Schools in Salt Lake County, Utah
Buildings and structures in West Valley City, Utah
1964 establishments in Utah